Blue Mound Township may refer to:

 Blue Mound Township, McLean County, Illinois
 Blue Mound Township, Macon County, Illinois
 Blue Mound Township, Linn County, Kansas, in Linn County, Kansas
 Blue Mound Township, Livingston County, Missouri
 Blue Mound Township, Vernon County, Missouri

See also
 Blue Mounds Township, Pope County, Minnesota

Township name disambiguation pages